The Arunachal Pradesh women's cricket team is a women's cricket team that represents the Indian state of Arunachal Pradesh. They were formed in 2012, and have competed in the Indian women's domestic system since the 2018–19 season, in the Women's Senior One Day Trophy and the Women's Senior T20 Trophy.

History
Arunachal Pradesh Women first played in 2012, in the BCCI Associate Members Women's Tournament, playing four matches, losing three with one match abandoned. The team joined the full Indian domestic system ahead of the 2018–19 season, after an expansion of teams in Indian domestic cricket. In their first season, they competed in the Senior Women's One Day League, finishing 8th out of 9 in the Plate competition, and in the Senior Women's T20 League, finishing bottom of their group.

The following season, 2019–20, Arunachal Pradesh finished bottom in both the Plate competition of the Senior Women's One Day League and Group E of the Senior Women's T20 League. The following season, 2020–21, with only the One Day League going ahead, Arunachal Pradesh again finished bottom of their group, losing all seven of their matches. They finished bottom of their group in both tournaments in 2021–22 and 2022–23. Arunachal Pradesh have only ever won one match to date, a 34-run victory over Sikkim in the 2018–19 One Day League.

Seasons

Women's Senior One Day Trophy

Senior Women's T20 League

See also
 Arunachal Pradesh cricket team

References

Women's cricket teams in India
Cricket in Arunachal Pradesh
Cricket clubs established in 2012
2012 establishments in Arunachal Pradesh